Krystyna M. Kuperberg (born Krystyna M. Trybulec; 17 July 1944) is a Polish-American mathematician who currently works as a professor of mathematics at Auburn University, where she was formerly an Alumni Professor of Mathematics.

Early life and family
Her parents, Jan W. and Barbara H. Trybulec, were pharmacists and owned a pharmacy in Tarnów.  Her older brother is Andrzej Trybulec.  Her husband Włodzimierz Kuperberg and her son Greg Kuperberg are also mathematicians, while her daughter Anna Kuperberg is a photographer.

Education and career
After attending high school in Gdańsk, she entered the University of Warsaw in 1962, where she studied  mathematics.  Her first mathematics course was taught by Andrzej Mostowski; later she attended topology lectures of Karol Borsuk and became fascinated by topology.

After obtaining her undergraduate degree, Kuperberg began graduate studies at Warsaw under Borsuk, but stopped after earning a master's degree.  She left Poland in 1969 with her young family to live in Sweden, then moved to the United States in 1972. She finished her Ph.D. in 1974, from Rice University, under the supervision of William Jaco. In the same year, both she and her husband were appointed to the faculty of Auburn University.

Contributions
In 1987 she solved a problem of Bronisław Knaster concerning bi-homogeneity of continua. In the 1980s she became interested in fixed points and topological aspects of dynamical systems.  In 1989 Kuperberg and Coke Reed solved a problem posed by Stan Ulam in the Scottish Book.   The solution to that problem led to her 1993 work in which she constructed a smooth counterexample to the Seifert conjecture.  She has since continued to work in dynamical systems.

Recognition
In 1995 Kuperberg received the Alfred Jurzykowski Prize from the Kościuszko Foundation. Her major lectures include an American Mathematical Society Plenary Lecture in March 1995, a Mathematical Association of America Plenary Lecture in January 1996, and an International Congress of Mathematicians invited talk in 1998.  In 2012 she became a fellow of the American Mathematical Society.

Selected publications

References

Polish emigrants to the United States
American women mathematicians
Polish women mathematicians
20th-century American mathematicians
21st-century American mathematicians
20th-century Polish mathematicians
21st-century Polish mathematicians
Topologists
1944 births
Living people
People from Tarnów
University of Warsaw alumni
Rice University alumni
Auburn University faculty
Fellows of the American Mathematical Society
Dynamical systems theorists
20th-century women mathematicians
21st-century women mathematicians
20th-century American women
21st-century American women
20th-century Polish women